Gabriel Garang Aher Arol is a South Sudanese politician. He served as a member of the East African Legislative Assembly from 2017 to 2022.

References

Living people
21st-century South Sudanese politicians
Members of the East African Legislative Assembly
Year of birth missing (living people)
Place of birth missing (living people)